Rewaz Fayeq is a Kurdish politician who was elected as the Speaker of the Kurdistan Regional Parliament in July 2019. She is a member of the Patriotic Union of Kurdistan party.

Fayaq was born in 1977 in Kalar district of Sulaymaniyah. She has a doctorate in Civil and Investment Law and was a member of the Industry, Energy, and Natural Resources and Legal Affairs Committees of the Parliament. She worked as an investigator in the local court in Darbandikhan, and was appointed as a professor and head of the Law Department of the Technical Institute of Sulaymaniyah.

As a PUK MP in 2014, Fayaq criticised KDP leader Massoud Barzani during a conflict with Iraqi PM Nuri al-Maliki, saying that "Barzani has no right to decide on the destiny/future of the Kurdistan Region".

In 2019, Fayaq called for a meeting with the US Consul General to Iraq over concerns that the 2020 budget process of the Iraqi government would not be fair to the Kurdistan region. "Iraq should not use the 2020 budget as an instrument of pressure on the Kurdistani people”, said Fayaq in a statement.

On July 11, 2019, Fayaq was elected Speaker of the Kurdistan Region Parliament, succeeding Vala Fareed. She was congratulated by Nechirvan Barzani, President of the Kurdistan Region.

References 

Kurdish politicians
Speakers of the Kurdistan Region Parliament
Patriotic Union of Kurdistan politicians
21st-century Iraqi women politicians
21st-century Iraqi politicians
Kurdish women in politics
1977 births
Living people
Iraqi Kurdish women